Calliostoma nakamigawai is a species of sea snail, a marine gastropod mollusk in the family Calliostomatidae.

Some authors place this taxon in the subgenus Calliostoma (Tristichotrochus).

Description

Distribution
This marine species occurs off Japan.

References

External links

nakamigawai
Gastropods described in 1994